Alba Giselle Reyes Santos (born June 15, 1981) is a Puerto Rican actress, model and beauty pageant titleholder who won the title of Miss Puerto Rico Universe 2004 in which later on she placed 2nd Runner-Up at the Miss Universe 2004 pageant, and won the award of Miss Photogenic. She is known for being the first woman with noticeably mixed (African and Indigenous) features to represent Puerto Rico at Miss Universe, different from past titleholders who all have distinct European features. She obtained a Juris Doctor magna cum laude from the University of Puerto Rico School of Law in 2011, although she never became a licensed lawyer.

In 2013, Reyes was a contestant on Ready for Love, in which she competed for the attention of Ernesto Arguello where she finished as runner-up to Shandi Finnessey, whom she had competed against in Miss Universe 2004.

References

1981 births
Living people
Miss Puerto Rico winners
Miss Universe 2004 contestants
People from Cidra, Puerto Rico
Puerto Rican beauty pageant winners
Puerto Rican female models
University of Puerto Rico alumni
21st-century American women